Utricularia guyanensis is a small, probably perennial, terrestrial carnivorous plant that belongs to the genus Utricularia and is the only member of Utricularia sect. Stylotheca. U. guyanensis is native to Central (Honduras and Nicaragua) and South America (Brazil, French Guiana, Guyana, Suriname, and Venezuela). It has been collected in flower between January and November. It was originally published and described by Alphonse Pyrame de Candolle in 1844 and placed in its own section, Stylotheca.

See also 
 List of Utricularia species

References 

Carnivorous plants of Central America
Carnivorous plants of South America
Flora of Brazil
Flora of French Guiana
Flora of Guyana
Flora of Honduras
Flora of Nicaragua
Flora of Suriname
Flora of Venezuela
guyanensis
Plants described in 1844